The Voice: Generations is an Australian singing competition television series. It premiered on the Seven Network on 31 January 2022. Based on the original The Voice of Holland, it is the latest spin-off of The Voice  franchise.

Unlike the main series, the show features groups of at least two members coming from different generations with no age limit. Groups must have a pre-existing relationship such as families, friends, students and teachers, neighbours, and the like.

The series employs a panel of four coaches who critique the artists' performances and guide their teams of selected artists through the remainder of the season. They also compete to ensure that their act wins the competition, thus making them the winning coach. The coaching panel consists of Keith Urban, Guy Sebastian, Rita Ora, and Jessica Mauboy.

Production

On 16 July 2021, The Voice casting website announced the application for a new version of the show to be broadcast in 2022: The Voice: Generations, where family or friend groups consisting in singers of all ages are the ones who can apply. This is an original version of The Voice franchise, with the idea being adapted to the Lithuanian series a few weeks later. The first season is hosted by Sonia Kruger and has Jessica Mauboy, Rita Ora, Guy Sebastian and Keith Urban as coaches.

Format
The show is part of The Voice franchise and comprises three rounds: blind auditions, battle rounds, and grand finale.

Blind auditions
Four coaches, all noteworthy recording artists, create their teams of two groups through a blind audition process during the auditionee's performance. If two or more judges want the same group, the group has the final choice of coach.

Battles
Each group of singers is mentored and developed by their respective coach. In the Battles, coaches pit their two acts to go against each other in a sing-off. They all have different songs, after which the coach chooses which act will advance into the Grand Finale.

Grand finale
The final four groups compete against each other with the winner being decided by a public vote. Caitlin & Tim, from Team Rita, won the competition.

Coaches and hosts
Prior to the premiere of the show, it was announced that Urban, Ora, Mauboy, and Sebastian would serve as the coaches for the series, all of whom have served as coaches in the tenth season of the original series. Sonia Kruger, who was also in the main version, is the show's host.

Series overview

Season one

Teams
Colour key
  Winner
  Finalist
  Eliminated in the Battles

After the auditions, half of The Wenas had to self-isolate, and hence, spent the rest of the season from home.

Blind auditions
In the blind auditions, the coaches can get only two artists to fill their respective teams.

Battles
The Battles premiered at the second half of the second episode. The coaches gave their two groups different songs to sing in the battles. The coaches then had to choose one of their two groups to send through to the Grand Finals.

Color key

 – Contestant wins battle round and advances to the Grand Finals
 – Contestant loses battle round and is eliminated
|}

Grand Finals
The Grand Finals was aired on 2 February, with each group performing a song. This is the only episode where the results were determined by the public and not the coaches. With Caitlin and Tim winning, they are the first winners of the Voice Generations and marks Rita's first win on the Voice.

Ratings

See also

 List of Australian music television shows
 The Voice (franchise)
 List of Australian television series
 List of programs broadcast by Seven Network

References

External links
 Official website

 
Seven Network original programming
2022 Australian television series debuts
Australian music television series
English-language television shows
Music competitions in Australia
Television shows set in Sydney
Australian television series based on Dutch television series
Television series by ITV Studios